Laringa castelnaui is a species of nymphalid butterfly found in Asia.

Subspecies
Laringa castelnaui castelnaui, the Blue Dandy, (southern Burma to Peninsular Malaya, possibly Singapore)
Laringa castelnaui ochus Fruhstorfer (Borneo)
Laringa castelnaui ottonis Fruhstorfer (Palawan)
Laringa castelnaui niha Fruhstorfer (Nias)
Laringa castelnaui fruhstorferi de Nicéville (eastern Java)

References

Biblidinae
Butterflies of Borneo
Butterflies of Java
Butterflies described in 1860
Butterflies of Asia
Taxa named by Baron Cajetan von Felder
Taxa named by Rudolf Felder